Moshe "Mosh" Ben Ari (born 21 September 1970) is an Israeli musician, lyricist, and composer.

Biography
Ben Ari was born in Afula, Israel, to a family of Mizrahi Jewish background. He first discovered music as a child through the traditional Jewish and ethnic chants that were part of his everyday life. He started playing music at the age of 16 and has since studied music around the world, including in India, the Sahara, and the Sinai. He plays various string instruments including acoustic and classic guitar, Indian sarod, Persian tar, Turkish cümbüş, Moroccan sintir, and bass.

In 1997, together with a few friends, he founded the world music ensemble Sheva (Seven). The band members come from Muslim and Jewish backgrounds and the main theme in their songs is the call for peace in the Middle East and around the world. Their first album,  ("Heavenly Wedding" or "Celestial Marriage") featured the hit song Salaam ("",), also known as ′Od Yavoh′ Shalom ′Alaynu (""lit. "Still, it will come, Peace upon us"). The band has released four studio albums and one live album.

In 2001, Ben-Ari's debut solo album, Ad Elay ("", "Unto me"), came out. In 2004, he released his second album, Derekh ("", "Way" or "Path"). This album quickly went Gold in Israel. In 2006, Ben-Ari's third album, Masa UMatan ("Negotiations" lit.  "Journey and Provision" ""), was released.

All of Ben-Ari's albums have been produced by Globalev World Music, in Israel. His music is a blend of rock, soul, reggae, and world music.

Ben-Ari was featured in Central Park's Summerstage Tour on 29 June 2008.

Aside from his musical career, Mosh Ben-Ari served as coach and mentor on the third season of the television show The Voice Israel.

Discography

with Sheva
 החתונה השמיימית (Celestial Wedding - 1997)
 יום ולילה (Day & Night - 1999)
 גן (Garden - 2002)
 Live in Australia (2005)
 Sheva (2006)

Solo
 Ad Elay (2001)
 Derech (2004)
 Masa UMatan (2006)
 Ad Elai (2007)
 Enshom (2009)
 תסתכל לי בעיניים (Look me in the eye - 2011)
 Soof (2013)
 כמו בחיים (Lifelike - 2013)
 Kmo Ba'haim (2013)

References

External links

 [www.moshbenari.net Official website]

Living people
1970 births
20th-century Israeli male singers
Israeli composers
Israeli people of Iraqi-Jewish descent
Israeli people of French-Jewish descent
People from Afula
21st-century Israeli male singers
Israeli Mizrahi Jews